NRAS is an enzyme that in humans is encoded by the NRAS gene. It was discovered by a small team of researchers led by Robin Weiss at the Institute of Cancer Research in London. It was the third RAS gene to be discovered, and was named  NRAS, for its initial identification in human neuroblastoma cells.

Function 

The N-ras proto-oncogene is a member of the Ras gene family. It is mapped on chromosome 1, and it is activated in HL60, a promyelocytic leukemia line. The order of nearby genes is as follows: cen—CD2—NGFB—NRAS—tel.

The mammalian Ras gene family consists of the Harvey and Kirsten Ras genes (HRAS and KRAS), an inactive pseudogene of each (c-Hras2 and c-Kras1) and the N-Ras gene. They differ significantly only in the C-terminal 40 amino acids. These Ras genes have GTP/GDP binding and GTPase activity, and their normal function may be as G-like regulatory proteins involved in the normal control of cell growth.

The N-Ras gene specifies two main transcripts of 2 kb and 4.3 kb. The difference between the two transcripts is a simple extension through the termination site of the 2 kb transcript. The N-Ras gene consists of seven exons (-I, I, II, III, IV, V, VI). The smaller 2 kb transcript contains the VIa exon, and the larger 4.3 kb transcript contains the VIb exon which is just a longer form of the VIa exon. Both transcripts encode identical proteins as they differ only the 3′ untranslated region.

Mutations
Mutations which change amino acid residues 12, 13 or 61 activate the potential of N-ras to transform cultured cells and are implicated in a variety of human tumors e.g. melanoma.

As a drug target
Binimetinib (MEK162) has had a phase III clinical trial for NRAS Q61 mutant melanoma.

References

Further reading

External links
  GeneReviews/NCBI/NIH/UW entry on Noonan syndrome

Oncogenes